Canora-Pelly is a provincial electoral district for the Legislative Assembly of Saskatchewan, Canada. The constituency was created by the Representation Act, 1994 (Saskatchewan) out of the former districts of Canora and Pelly.

Located in east central Saskatchewan, this constituency is made up of one of the province's most densely populated rural areas. The economy is based on mixed farming; primarily in the northern areas. The southern portion of the riding relies mainly on straight grain farming. Duck Mountain Provincial Park and Good Spirit Lake Provincial Park are also located in this constituency.

In 1899, much of the territory now covered by Canora-Pelly district fell within the block settlement land grant that became the first Canadian home of the Doukhobors. The village of Veregin – named after the Doukhobor leader Peter Verigin – was the central hub of the settlement.

The largest communities are Canora and Kamsack with populations of 2,013 and 1,713 respectively. Other centres in the riding include the towns of Preeceville, Norquay, Springside, and Sturgis; and the villages of Pelly, Theodore, Endeavour, Buchanan, and Ebenezer (formerly "Ebenezer Valley").

Members of the Legislative Assembly

This riding has elected the following Members of the Legislative Assembly:

Election results

2020 Saskatchewan general election

2016 Saskatchewan general election

2011 Saskatchewan general election

2007 Saskatchewan general election

2003 Saskatchewan general election

1999 Saskatchewan general election

1995 Saskatchewan general election

References

External links 
Website of the Legislative Assembly of Saskatchewan
Saskatchewan Archives Board – Saskatchewan Election Results By Electoral Division

Saskatchewan provincial electoral districts
Canora, Saskatchewan